Fazal Karim Miah is an Indian politician from the state of West Bengal. He was formerly a member of the West Bengal Legislative Assembly.

Early life and background
Miah was born on 2 August 1951 to Piaruddin Miah and his wife, who belonged to a Sunni Muslim family. He worked at a government-funded school before entering politics at an old age.

Political career
Miah competed and won in the 2016 West Bengal elections where he represented the All India Trinamool Congress in the Tufanganj constituency.

References 

West Bengal MLAs 2016–2021
Living people
Trinamool Congress politicians from West Bengal
Indian Sunni Muslims
21st-century Indian Muslims
21st-century Indian politicians
1951 births